The 1991 Toray Pan Pacific Open was a women's tennis tournament played on indoor carpet courts at the Tokyo Metropolitan Gymnasium in Tokyo, Japan that was part of the Tier II Series of the 1991 WTA Tour. It was the eighth edition of the Pan Pacific Open and took place from 29 January through 3 February 1991. Fifth-seeded Gabriela Sabatini won the singles title and earned $70,000 first-prize money as well as 300 ranking points.

Finals

Singles
 Gabriela Sabatini defeated   Martina Navratilova 2–6, 6–2, 6–4
 It was Sabatini's 1st singles title of the year and the 16th of her career.

Doubles
 Kathy Jordan /  Elizabeth Smylie  defeated  Mary Joe Fernández /  Robin White 4–6, 6–0, 6–3

References

External links
 ITF tournament edition details
 Tournament draws